Artaxa is a genus of tussock moths in the family Erebidae erected by Francis Walker in 1855. Some of the species have urticating hairs.

Species
Artaxa angulata 
Artaxa cina  (Borneo)
Artaxa comparata  (India, Sri Lanka)
Artaxa digramma  (India, Sri Lanka, Myanmar, Java)
Artaxa distracta  (Sarawak)
Artaxa fulvistriata  (Papua New Guinea)
Artaxa gentia  (Borneo)
Artaxa guttata  (India, Sri Lanka, Myanmar)
Artaxa hannemanni  (Borneo, Peninsular Malaysia, Sumatra)
Artaxa hemixantha  (Borneo)
Artaxa lunula 
Artaxa maza  (New Guinea)
Artaxa montiphaula (Borneo, Sarawak)
Artaxa nubilosa  (Sumatra)
Artaxa ormea  (Borneo, Sumatra)
Artaxa pentatoxa  (New Guinea)
Artaxa phaula  (Malaysia peninsular, Borneo)
Artaxa rubiginosa  (Java)
Artaxa sabahensis  (Borneo)
Artaxa tanaoptera  (Celebes)
Artaxa tuhana  (Borneo)
Artaxa vitellina  (India, Sri Lanka)

References

Lymantriinae
Noctuoidea genera